von Hagen is a surname. Notable people with the surname include:

Albrecht von Hagen (1904–1944), German jurist and resistance fighter
Elizabeth Joanetta Catherine von Hagen (1750–1809), Dutch pianist, music educator and composer
Johann Ludwig von Hagen (1492–1547), Archbishop of Trier
Kristeen Von Hagen (born 1976), Canadian comedian and actor
Mark von Hagen (1954–2019), American historian
Victor Wolfgang von Hagen (1908–1985), American explorer, historian and anthropologist